Live to Win is the second solo studio album from Kiss vocalist, guitarist and co-founder Paul Stanley, released on October 24, 2006. The album's title track was featured in the South Park episode "Make Love, Not Warcraft", twenty days prior to the album's release.

Background
Stanley last released a solo album in 1978, Paul Stanley, which was officially released as a Kiss album. Comparing the two albums, Stanley said "It's not 1978 anymore... It's certainly the same mentality, and certainly I'm a better singer today. My perspective and where I'm at in my life at this point, and what I've experienced and seen, brings something else to the table that wasn't there then. But I still look back on that album as a really great snapshot of who I was and what I was doing then."

Stanley supported the album's release with a club tour in late 2006, with one of the shows released on CD and DVD as One Live Kiss.

Track listing

Personnel
Paul Stanley – lead and backing vocals, guitar, percussion, string arrangements ( 4, 7, 9)
Corky James – guitar, bass guitar (1, 3, 6, 8, 10)
Tommy Denander – electric guitar (1, 3)
Brad Fernquist – lead guitar (1, 3, 4, 6 to 9)
John 5 – lead guitar (5, 10)
Andreas Carlsson – guitar (5), backing vocals (5)
Sean Hurley – bass guitar (2, 5, 10)
Bruce Kulick – bass guitar ( 4, 7, 9)
Victor Indrizzo – drums
Greg Kurstin – piano (4, 7, 9)
Zac Rae – piano (5)
Harry Sommerdahl – keyboards (1 to 3, 5, 7, 10)
Russ Irwin – additional keyboards and programming (4, 6, 8)
C.C. White – backing vocals (5, 10)
John Shanks – backing vocals (10)
David Campbell – conductor ( 4, 7, 9), orchestratation ( 4, 7, 9), strings arrangements ( 4, 7, 9)
Tom Jermann/t42design – art direction, design
Alex Gibson – audio engineering
Neil Zlozower – photography

Charts

References

External links
 
 
  

2006 albums
Paul Stanley albums
Albums produced by Paul Stanley
Albums recorded at A&M Studios